This was the first edition of the tournament.

Olga Danilović won her first WTA Tour title, defeating Anastasia Potapova in the final, 7–5, 6–7(1–7), 6–4. Danilović became the first player born after 2000 to win a WTA singles title, and the first lucky loser to win a singles title since Andrea Jaeger in 1980. This was the first WTA Tour final between two players under 18 since Tatiana Golovin and Nicole Vaidišová played in the final of the 2005 AIG Japan Open Tennis Championships.

Seeds

Draw

Finals

Top half

Bottom half

Qualifying

Seeds

Qualifiers

Lucky losers

Draw

First qualifier

Second qualifier

Third qualifier

Fourth qualifier

Fifth qualifier

Sixth qualifier

References

Main Draw
Qualifying Draw

Moscow River Cup - Women's Singles
2018 Women's Singles